Rubley is a surname. Notable people with the surname include:

Carole A. Rubley (born 1939), American politician
T. J. Rubley (born 1968), American football quarterback

See also
Rublev